"The Four of Us Are Dying" is episode 13 of the American television anthology series The Twilight Zone. It originally aired on CBS on January 1, 1960.

Opening narration

Plot
Arch Hammer is a con man who can change his face to look like anyone he chooses. He walks into a nightclub, where he impersonates deceased trumpeter Johnny Foster to steal Foster's grieving girlfriend Maggie, a sultry singer.

Next, while impersonating murdered gangster Virgil Sterig, Hammer pays a visit to Mr. Pennell, to extort money; Pennell is the man who had Sterig killed. Pennell sends his men after Hammer.

Trying to escape down an alley, Hammer sees a poster of boxer Andy Marshak, and changes his face to the fighter's. Pennell's men are fooled.  Thinking he is in the clear, he runs into Marshak's father at a street newsstand, who mistakes him for the son who broke his mother's heart and "did dirt to a sweet decent little girl who would've cut off an arm for" him. As Mr. Marshak reels off the reasons why he hates Andy and his punk behavior, Hammer pushes the old man out of the way and returns to his hotel room. A detective comes by to pick him up for questioning; together, they leave for the police station. As they enter the hotel's revolving door, Hammer again assumes the boxer's appearance. The detective rushes back into the building to find Hammer.

Marshak's father is standing on the street, with a gun on Hammer. The con man tries to demonstrate that he is not who the old man thinks he is, but before he can concentrate and change his face, Mr. Marshak shoots him. As Hammer lies dying, his face shifts from one person to another until he dies wearing his own face.

Closing narration

Production
"After the first half-dozen stories had been written, part of the hustle was getting an agent. Through those years I found several who would let me use their names, though few cared to sign a contract with me. One of these men, Jay Richards - at the time head of the television department of the Famous Artists Agency, long since absorbed by I.F.A. (International Famous Agency), and since embedded in I.C.M. (International Creative Management), which represents me now in television and movies - agreed to read something. I showed Jay 'All of Us Are Dying.' After reading it, he crossed out the title with a ballpoint pen and wrote in 'Rubberface!' Then he sent it to Rod Serling, who had a new series that season called The Twilight Zone." — George Clayton Johnson, writing in the August 1981 issue of The Twilight Zone Magazine

In 2005, "The Four of Us Are Dying" was produced for the stage by 4 Letter Entertainment.

Further reading
Zicree, Marc Scott: The Twilight Zone Companion.  Sillman-James Press, 1982 (second edition)
DeVoe, Bill. (2008). Trivia from The Twilight Zone. Albany, GA: Bear Manor Media. 
Grams, Martin. (2008). The Twilight Zone: Unlocking the Door to a Television Classic. Churchville, MD: OTR Publishing.

External links
 

1960 American television episodes
The Twilight Zone (1959 TV series season 1) episodes
Fiction about shapeshifting
Television episodes written by George Clayton Johnson
Television shows based on short fiction